Jogamaya Devi College is one of the oldest and leading women's colleges in Kolkata, India. It shares the same building with Asutosh College (day college) and Syamaprasad College (evening college) and is named after the wife of Sir Asutosh Mukherjee. It is a National Assessment and Accreditation Council (NAAC) accredited Grade "B" college. It offers undergraduate and postgraduate degrees and is affiliated to the University of Calcutta. It was established in 1932.

Notable alumni
Mamata Banerjee, Chief Minister of West Bengal
 Ananya Chatterjee, Bengali actress
 Bijoya Ray, wife of filmmaker Satyajit Ray
 Indrani Haldar, Bengali actress
 Karuna Banerjee, actress, best known for her role in The Apu Trilogy
 Kaushiki Chakrabarty, Indian classical vocalist
 Locket Chatterjee, Actress, BJP Member of Parliament.
 Maitreyi Devi, poet, recipient of the Sahitya Akademi Award
 Poulomi Ghatak, table tennis player
 Reshmi Ghosh, Miss India Earth 2002
 Roopa Ganguly, Indian actress, best known for playing the role of Draupadi in Mahabharat
 Soumili Biswas, Bengali actress
 Suchitra Bhattacharya, novelist
 Suparna Patra, Bengali Actress
 Satabdi Roy, Actress, Politician

See also
 Asutosh College
 Syamaprasad College
List of colleges affiliated to the University of Calcutta
Education in India
Education in West Bengal

References

External links
 

University of Calcutta affiliates
Educational institutions established in 1932
Women's universities and colleges in West Bengal
Universities and colleges in Kolkata
Arts colleges in India
Schools in Colonial India
1932 establishments in British India